Parsadih is a small Village/hamlet in Baloda Bazar Tehsil and District of Chhattisgarh State in India.

Dr Bhushan Lal Jangde, the Rajya Sabha member and Member of Parliament from Chhattisgarh is from this village.

References

Villages in Baloda Bazar district